Vladi Panato (born 28 October 1972) is an Italian male canoeist who won 15 medals at senior level at the Wildwater Canoeing World Championships.

The myth has won 11 world cups making it the canoeist with the highest record of victories, six in a row from 1994 to 1999, then from 2001 to 2003, 2005 and in 2007 the eleventh and last one.

Biography
His two daughters Cecilia and Alice are also canoeists. From 2017 he is also the technical director of the Italy national wildwater canoeing team, having taken over the role of another Italian canoeing legend, Robert Pontarollo.

In 2004 Vladi Panato ended the World Cup season with 192 points as the winner, but with equal partial successes (2) he was ranked second for the lowest number of second places (2 against 3). Panato had forfeited the sixth and final race in protest, although only one point would have been enough to win his ninth world cup. The winner was Tomislav Hohnjec.

Medals at the World Championships
Senior

World Cup results
Panato won eleven editions of the Wildwater Canoeing World Cup in C1 classic.

References

External links
 

1972 births
Living people
Italian male canoeists
Italian sports coaches
20th-century Italian people
21st-century Italian people